Veera Simha Reddy is a 2023 Indian Telugu-language action drama film written and directed by Gopichand Malineni and produced by Mythri Movie Makers. It stars Nandamuri Balakrishna in a dual role along with Shruti Haasan, Varalaxmi Sarathkumar, Honey Rose, and Duniya Vijay. The film score and soundtrack were composed by S. Thaman.

Principal photography commenced in February 2022 and ended in December 2022. Veera Simha Reddy was released on 12 January 2023, coinciding on the Sankranthi weekend.

Plot 
In Istanbul, Meenakshi runs a burgeoning restaurant of Rayalaseema Cuisine and lives with her son Jai Simha Reddy, who indulges in car dealerships and is acquainted with a tone-deaf wannabe singer Isha the daughter of a tycoon Jayaram and they fall in love. At the marriage proposal, Meenakshi discloses about Jai's father Veera Simha Reddy, a leader in Pulicherla, Andhra Pradesh. 

Veera Simha Reddy is the arbiter who efforts towards eradicating the infamous factionalism. He odds with fiend faction leader Pratap Reddy that aims to assassinate him. At a plurality of times, Pratap Reddy tries to finish Veera Simha Reddy, but is always defeated, which enrages his wife Bhanumati as she wants to avenge her miseries caused by Veera Simha Reddy. Pratap Reddy ruses by mingling with his uncle Peddi Reddy, a minister, to squat a factory owned by industrialist Raj Gopal constructed 30 years ago by the aim of Veera Simha Reddy. They are also going to lay a foundation stone for a new factory to which prominent politicians are arriving. 

Immediately, Raj Gopal proceeds to Veera Simha Reddy’s aid stating the status quo when he gallantly encounters and backfires them single-handedly at the border itself. Later, Veera Simha Reddy receives a phon call from Meenakshi who invites him to Turkey. After reaching, Veera Simha Reddy unites with Jai, who is unbeknownst to him, and thanks Meenakshi for respecting his decision years ago. They meet Jayaram, who happily gives his acceptance. After their departure, Jayaram is frightened as he is the investor in the factory whose construction is blocked by Veera Simha Reddy. Jayaram indicates the presence of Veera Simha Reddy in Turkey where Pratap Reddy and Bhanumati arrive and finishes him, while also revealing that Bhanumati is Veera Simha Reddy's sister. 

Jai attempts to save Veera Simha Reddy, who stops him saying that he can die repeatedly for Bhanumathi. Before leaving his breath, Veera Simha Reddy instructs Jai to perform his final rights in his motherland. As per guidelines, Jai carries his father’s corpse to Rayalaseema and conducts the funeral between a great multitude of fanatics drowning under woe. Following, Jai questions the underlying reason for Bhanumati's enmity against her brother when Siddhappa, Veera Simha Reddy's trusted lieutenant divulges the past. Bhanumati was the illicit child of Veera Simha Reddy’s father, yet he idolized and dedicated his life to her. Meenakshi was his cross-cousin who endeared him from childhood and was betrothed to him. He asked her to wait until the accomplishment of Bhanumati’s espousal, but unfortunately they consummated. 

Besides, the adjacent village Musali Madugu was in jeopardy of Pratap Reddy's father Gangi Reddy. Once a child the victim of his atrocities, approached Veera Simha Reddy to liberate them from Gangi Reddy’s evil clutches. Forthwith, Veera Simha Reddy charged on savage, decapitated Gangi Reddy, takes control over the reign, and dropped Pratap Reddy providing a final notice. In the interim, Bhanumati loved Siddhappa's son Shekar. Learning this, Veera Simha Reddy heartfully gave his approval and engaged them. Apart from that, every year customary contests are held in that area where Veera Simha Reddy triumphs. However, Pratap Reddy subterfuged him when Shekar took part to protect Veera Simha Reddy's reputation and was beaten. 

At this point, Pratap Reddy heckled Shekar and exaggerated his anger. Furious, a drunkard Shekar indulged in gunfire that inadvertently killed a villager Suri. Currently, Veera Simha Reddy uprights piety and ostracized Shekar, who later committed suicide. Heartbroken, Bhanumati pledged to seek vengeance. On that account, she married Pratap Reddy and commanded him not to touch her before Veera Simha Reddy’s death. Thus, Veera Simha Reddy lifts Pratap Reddy alive for his sister and decided to renunciation all comforts as a penalty, where he requested Meenakshi to quit his life, who relucantly agreed and had hidden her pregnancy. After the revelation, Siddhappa tells Jai to retrieve back. Raj Gopal switches to surrendering the factory to miscreants. 

Jai strikes on them to perpetuate his father's ambition and also challenges Pratap to enter without his aunt’s background. Infuriated by Jai's comment, Pratap Reddy smacks Bhanumati asserting that he is the one who instigated vengeance in her mind by killing Shekar. Distraught, Bhanumati meets Jai and apologizes to him, where she kills herself by slitting her throat. During the time of her cremation, Pratap Reddy attacks Jai. However, Jai manages to finish Pratap Reddy and merges his aunt’s ashes in his father’s grave, where he continues his father's legacy.

Cast 

 Nandamuri Balakrishna in a dual role as Pulicherla Veera Simha Reddy and Jai Simha Reddy
 Varalaxmi Sarathkumar as Bhanumathi, Pratap Reddy's wife, Veera Simha Reddy's half-sister, and Jai's aunt
 Honey Rose as Pulicherla Meenakshi, Veera Simha Reddy's girlfriend and Jai's mother
 Duniya Vijay as Musali Madugu Pratap Reddy, Veera Simha Reddy’s rival, Gangi Reddy’s son and Bhanumati’s husband
 Shruti Haasan as Isha Jayaram, Jayaram's daughter and Jai's love interest
 Lal as Siddhappa, Veera Simha Reddy’s right-hand man
 Naveen Chandra as Shekhar, Siddhappa's son and Bhanumati’s ex-fiance
 Ajay Ghosh as Addibakula Peddi Reddy, Pratap Reddy’s uncle
 Murali Sharma as Jayaram, Isha’s father
 John Kokken as Pratap Reddy's cousin
 P. Ravi Shankar as Home Minister Krishna Reddy
 B. S. Avinash as Musali Madugu Gangi Reddy, Pratap Reddy's father
 Pammi Sai as Sai Reddy, Peddi Reddy's PA
 Sachin Khedekar as Rajagopal, Factory Owner
 Raghu Babu as Bhanumati’s suitor’s father
 Sapthagiri as Jai's supervisor
 Rajeev Kanakala as Suri, a villager
 Sekhar as Veeranna, Suri’s brother-in-law
 Easwari Rao as Siddhappa's wife
 Sameer as Veera Simha Reddy's father
 Annapurna as Veera Simha Reddy's grandmother
 Rajitha as Veera Simha Reddy’s relative
 Rajashree Nair as Meenakshi's mother 
 Naga Mahesh as Varada Reddy, a villager
 Goparaju Ramana as head priest
 Duvvasi Mohan as a priest
 Ananth Babu as a priest
 Chammak Chandra
 Archana Ananth as Isha's mother
 Aruna Bhikshu as Isha's grandmother
 Harika Koyilamma as Isha’s sister
 Siva Krishna as Ramgopal Reddy
 Meena Kumari as Veera Simha Reddy’s relative
 Chandrika Ravi in item number “Maa Bava Manobhavalu”
 Ramajogayya Sastry in a cameo appearance
 Brahmanandam in a cameo appearance as Ismail, a judge in the "Voice of Europe" music show
 Ali in a cameo appearance as Darbar, a judge in the "Voice of Europe" music show
 Manisha Eerabathini in a cameo appearance as host in the "Voice of Europe" music show
 Master Sathwik as a victim of Gangi Reddy

Production 
The film was officially announced by Mythri Movie Makers in June 2021 with the working title NBK107 starring Nandamuri Balakrishna and directed by Gopichand Malineni. The film was formally launched with a pooja ceremony on 13 November 2021. The film was reported to go on floors by the first quarter of 2022.

Principal photography of the film commenced on 18 February 2022 in Sircilla and ended in December 2022. In October 2022, the film's official title was unveiled as Veera Simha Reddy.

Music

The music of the film is composed by Thaman S. The first single titled "Jai Balayya" was released on 26 November 2022. The second single titled "Suguna Sundari" was released on 15 December 2022. The third single titled "Maa Bava Manobhavalu" was released on 24 December 2022. The fourth single titled "Mass Mogudu" was released on 9 January 2023.

Release

Theatrical 
Veera Simha Reddy released on 12 January 2023, for the Sankranti weekend. Theatrical rights of the film were sold at a cost of ₹73 crore.

Home Media
The digital rights of the film were acquired by Disney+ Hotstar for ₹14 crore. The film was premiered on 23 February 2023 at 6:00 PM.

Reception

Critical reception 
123Telugu gave 3 out of 5 stars and wrote "On the whole, Veera Simha Reddy is a decent action entertainer that has all the commercial elements to entertain Balakrishna fans." Manoj Kumar R of The Indian Express rated the film 3.25 out of 5 stars and wrote "The troubling part of Veera Simha Reddy, by that token most of Balakrishna's movies, is that it argues it's okay to kill to solve a problem". Neeshita Nyayapati of The Times of India gave 2.5 out of 5 stars and wrote "Veera Simha Reddy is Balakrishna’s film through-and-through. However, where he triumphs as Veera, he fails as Jai. Whenever the man comes on-screen donned is black is when you feel like paying attention, his cakey makeup and lukewarm performance while playing the other character takes away from it." Janani K of India Today gave  the film a rating of 2.5 out of 5 and termed the film as "reeks of clichéd ideas", criticised  the storyline while praised the performance of Balakrishna.

Haricharan Pudipeddi of Hindustan Times wrote "The film thrives on violence and some exquisitely shot action sequences, which are a treat to watch. As the central character Veera Simha Reddy, Balakrishna holds the film together and it’s quite literally a one-man show." Bhuvanesh Chandar of The Hindu wrote "Violent scenes that bank on shock value, powerful antagonists, and an intriguing larger narrative worked well to complement the slow-motion chest-thumping moments. In Veera Simha Reddy, we have a loosely knit and archaic narrative told through a template screenplay."

Box office 
Veera Simha Reddy grossed ₹54+ crore worldwide on its opening day, including ₹36.2 crore from Andhra Pradesh and Telangana combined. Thus, it became the highest opening grosser for Nandamuri Balakrishna. The film has grossed US$747,000 by the first day of its release in the United States. Movie collected  worldwide by the end of theatrical run in 50 Days.

References

External links 
 
 

2023 films
2023 action films
2023 drama films
Indian action drama films
2020s Telugu-language films
Films directed by Gopichand Malineni
Films scored by Thaman S
Mythri Movie Makers films
Indian action films
Films set in Istanbul
Films shot in Telangana
Films shot in Andhra Pradesh
Films set in Andhra Pradesh